Veer Kunwar Singh University was established on 22 October 1992 with its headquarters at Arrah, under the Bihar University Act 1976 [as amendment Act 9 of 1992]. It is named after Kunwar Singh, the well-known national hero and distinguished freedom fighter of 1857.

It is in the list of recognized universities under section 2(f) of the U.G.C. Act. All of its 17 constituent colleges and one affiliated college receive financial assistance from U.G.C. by virtue of being constituent/affiliated colleges of the erstwhile Magadh University in Bodh-Gaya, Bihar.

Academics
The university conducts teaching and learning in areas such as physics, chemistry, botany, zoology, mathematics, computer science, commerce, history, economics, management, law, sociology, geography, etc. It also runs exchange programs in affiliation with colleges and institutes in and around the state.

Colleges
Its jurisdiction extends over four districts, Bhojpur, Buxar, Kaimur and Rohtas.

Affiliated colleges
 Sumitra Mahila College Dumraon
 K.K Mandal College Buxar
 P.C College Buxar
 T.S.I.M College, Ara, Bhojpur
 Jan Sahkari College (Barap), Garhani Bhojpur

Mahthin Mai College 
Mathin Mai College was established in 2001. Currently the affiliation has been renewed by the university after the state government's decision. The college has provided education to students from all sections of society. This college offers undergraduate programs with specialization in Arts and Commerce stream, form 2022 onwards, it will also be affiliated for Science Stream with Computer Science and Information Practice.

Mathin Mai College, Bihiya was founded in the year 2000 by Lt. Baijnath Sharma. The college was started in rented premises in 2001.

Constituent colleges
 Harprasad Das Jain College, Ara	
 Maharaja College, Ara	
 S.B. College, Ara	
 Jagjiwan College, Arrah
 M.M. Mahila College, Ara	
 M.V. College, Buxar
 D.K. College, Dumraon	
 Shersah College, Sasaram	
 S.P. Jain College, Sasaram	
 Rohtas Mahila College, Sasaram	
 Sri Shankar College, Sasaram	
 A.S. College, Bikramganj	
 J.L.N. College, Dehri-on-sone	
 S.N. College, ShahmalKhairadeo	
 Mahila College, Dalmianagar	
 S.V.P. College, Bhabhua	
 Gram Bharti College, Ramgarh

Notable alumni
 Pawan Singh (Bhojpuri singer and Actor)

References

 
Universities in Bihar
Bhojpur district, India
1992 establishments in Bihar
Educational institutions established in 1992